Danny Boy is a 1934 British musical film directed by Oswald Mitchell and starring Frank Forbes-Robinson, Dorothy Dickson, Archie Pitt and Ronnie Hepworth. It was shot at Cricklewood Studios in London and released by Butcher's Film Service. Mitchell made another film also titled Danny Boy in 1941.

Synopsis
A theatrical couple find their relationship strained when the wife is far more successful than her husband.

Cast
 Frank Forbes-Robinson as Pat Clare
 Dorothy Dickson as Jane Kaye
 Archie Pitt as  Silver Sam
 Ronnie Hepworth as Danny
 Denis O'Neil as Mike
 Cyril Ritchard as John Martin
 Fred Duprez as Leo Newman
 Paul Neville as Maloney

References

Bibliography
 Low, Rachael. Filmmaking in 1930s Britain. George Allen & Unwin, 1985.
 Wood, Linda. British Films, 1927-1939. British Film Institute, 1986.

External links

1934 films
British musical films
Films directed by Oswald Mitchell
1934 musical films
British black-and-white films
1930s English-language films
1930s British films
Films shot at Cricklewood Studios
Butcher's Film Service films